Olszewo  is a village in the administrative district of Gmina Brańsk, within Bielsk County, Podlaskie Voivodeship, in north-eastern Poland.

Massacre during World War II
In reprisal for the operations of the Suwalska Cavalry Brigade, during the evening of 13 September 1939 units of the German XIX Panzer Corps, under the command of General Heinz Guderian, murdered thirteen people (half of the villagers) from Olszewo and ten people from the nearby village of Pietkowo. The victims among the villagers include women and children. 

They were murdered in several ways, such as stabbing by bayonets, shooting, being torn apart by grenades, and being burned alive in a barn.

Victims of the Massacre
The victims included Poles and Ukrainians, one woman and a priest.

Villagers from Olszewo: 
 Wiktoria Borowska, female, age 30
 Teofil Borowski, male, age 36
 Emil Olendzki, male, age 62
 Piotr Olendski, male, age 60
 Jozef Olendzki, male, age 24
 Wiktor Olszewski, male, age 45
 Piotr Olszewski, male, age 40
 Antoni Poniatowski, male, age 18
 Aleksander Spalinski, male
 Boleslaw Szerakowski, male, age 48
 Aleksander Szerakowski, male, age 48
 Karol Zakrzewski, male, age 60
 Wincenty Zdrojkowski, male, age 30

Villagers from Pietkowo: 
 Kazimerz Dabrowski, male, age 21
 Bronislaw Grabowski, female, age 45
 Kazimerz Kielkucki, male, age 25
 Bronislaw Kowalewski, female, age 38
 Andrezej Osmolski, male, age 36
 Jozef Osmolski, male, age 34
 Stanislaw Sienkiewicz, male, age 40
 Stanislaw Sienko, male, age 18
 Jozef Wojcik, male, age 40
 Jerzy Zakrzewski, male, age 45

References

Villages in Bielsk County
Massacres in Poland
Nazi war crimes in Poland